Aayush Rijal, known also as Gopal Rijal, (born February 6, 1980) is a Nepali film actor, creative director, and narrator. His credits include music videos, television commercials, documentaries, and more than 30 feature films. Rijal began his cinematic career as a cinematographer.

Filmography

Political life
During the 2017 Nepalese general election,Rijal was reported near to Nepali Congress.

Awards

Music Videos
Nabirse Timi Lai

References

Nepalese actors
Nepalese film editors
Nepali film award winners
1980 births
Living people
People from Dhading District